Trupanea digrammata is a species of tephritid or fruit flies in the genus Trupanea of the family Tephritidae.

Distribution
Mexico.

References

Tephritinae
Insects described in 1947
Diptera of North America